Riley Wallace, known by the stage name Special, is a Canadian music artist from Toronto, Ontario. He reached 2 million views on YouTube for his Jersey Shore-influenced song "T-Shirt Time". He has released commercial projects in the US, Germany and Italy. His diverse body of music includes works with hip-hop artists Craig G (Juice Crew), El Da Sensei (The Artifacts) and Sadat X (Brand Nubian) and others.

CWA 
In 2009, Special wrote the song "Get Ready To Strike" which was originally intended to inspire the Communications Workers (CWA) Union members during a Local 6222 rally, but word of it spread to other chapters, who shared it on the internet. The song garnered thousands of views and downloads and was featured in the Wall Street Journal.

Group/Solo Career 
As a music artist, Special released two official music videos as part of the E-Team. One, "The Bar Ain't Far Away", was in rotation on Much Music. The other, "A Rapper's Motivation", was praised by industry insiders and urban bloggers. 
Special, along with his crew, the E-Team, released two mixtapes (BAFA: The Art of The Remix and Art is Life: The Mixtape) and an album (Art is Life: The Album), before they signed a major label deal with Universal/EMI Canada. They released the song "T-Shirt Time" in 2011, which has over two million plays. Their subsequent release, Get Right, featuring Tasha The Amazon, was released later that same year.

As a solo artist, Special has numerous projects and has worked with artists including: Sadat X, Craig G, Money B (Digital Underground), El Da Sensei and more. He is also closely affiliated with Jersey Sound Lab and has released a collaborative project with Internal Quest. He currently works with a live band called The Boom Bap Trio, and an LP is due out late 2015.

Discography

Official Singles 

T-Shirt Time (2011)
Get Right featuring Tasha The Amazon] (2012)
Never Know Me feat. Lilly Mason (2014)

Collaborative Projects 

Special and Internal Quest — Engineered To Win (2012)
Special and Tony Blount — Special & Tony Blount EP (2014)

EP's 

Mind's Eye (2013)
Oakland Masters (2014)

References

External links 
 Wall Street Journal Story
 Collection of Press Clipping about the song "Get Ready To Strike"
 Story about 'Get Ready To Strike' ringtone (All things Digital)
 Article mentioning the "Get Ready to Strike' ringtone (Network Trends Now)
 Article "Get Ready to Strike' ringtone (Beta News)
 "Get Ready to Strike' ringtone (DSL Reports)

Living people
Musicians from Toronto
Place of birth missing (living people)
1983 births